Lilla Anne Zuckerman is an American showrunner, television writer and producer.  She is currently the showrunner of Poker Face which was created by Rian Johnson and stars Natasha Lyonne. She has worked on a number of television series, most notably Agents of SHIELD, Prodigal Son, Suits, and Fringe. She has also worked on Human Target, and the Syfy original series Haven. She collaborates with her sister, Nora Zuckerman.

Career 
Zuckerman's television career began in 2009 when she started working with her sister as a staff writer and production staffer on the second season of the FOX series Fringe.

She then moved to another FOX series, Human Target. After Human Target's cancellation in May 2011, She and her sister were hired  on the Syfy series Haven, a mystery/thriller series based on The Colorado Kid by Stephen King, where they wrote eight episodes, including fan-favorites, "Audrey Parker's Day Off" and "Sarah".

With her sister Nora, the moved on to write and produce four episodes of the USA television series, Suits then spent four seasons as a co-executive producer on Marvel Television's series Agents of SHIELD which aired on ABC network.  They also served as co-executive producers on Fox's Prodigal Son.

Lilla and Nora just wrote, produced and completed their showrunning duties on Season One of   Poker Face, a throwback case-of-the-week procedural in the style of Columbo, streaming on Peacock Network. 

Lilla and Nora have sold multiple pilots to USA Network, CBS, Warner Brothers, and Peacock.

References

External links 
 
 
 https://variety.com/2021/tv/news/natasha-lyonee-rian-johnson-peacock-series-poker-face-showrunners-1235038288/
 https://www.hollywoodreporter.com/tv/tv-news/natasha-lyonne-rian-johnson-mystery-of-the-week-detective-inspirations-poker-face-1235303084/
 https://www.rollingstone.com/tv-movies/tv-movie-features/poker-face-rian-johnson-natasha-lyonne-interview-1234646956/
 https://www.vanityfair.com/hollywood/2022/12/poker-face-is-rian-johnsons-modern-take-on-retro-mystery

1974 births
American television writers
Living people
American women television writers
21st-century American women